Caroline Menjivar is an American politician and United States Marine Corps veteran, serving a member of the California State Senate since 2022. A Democrat, she represents the 20th Senate District. She was born in the San Fernando Valley and is an alumni of Reseda High School.

References

External links 
 Official website
 Caroline Menjivar at Ballotpedia
 Campaign website

Living people
LGBT people from California
Democratic Party California state senators
LGBT state legislators in California
University of California, Los Angeles alumni
21st-century American women politicians
21st-century American politicians
Year of birth missing (living people)